Homespun Folks is a 1920 American silent drama film directed by John Griffith Wray and starring Lloyd Hughes, Gladys George and George Webb. It was produced on a budget of $137,000, and grossed $241,000 at the box offices.

Plot
A young lawyer is appointed district attorney, but then finds himself accused of murder.

Cast
 Lloyd Hughes as Joel Webster 
 Gladys George as Beulah Rogers 
 George Webb as Tracy Holt 
 Al W. Filson as Pliny Rogers 
 Fred Gamble as Gabe Howard 
 Charles Hill Mailes as Caleb Webster
 Lydia Knott as Sarah Webster 
 Gordon Sackville as Watt Tanner 
 Willis Marks as Joseph Hargan 
 James Gordon as Hilary Rose 
 Edith Murgatroyd as Widow Stinson 
 Jefferson Osborne as Nat Orinley

References

Bibliography
 Lombardi, Frederic . Allan Dwan and the Rise and Decline of the Hollywood Studios. McFarland, 2013.
 Taves, Brian. Thomas Ince: Hollywood's Independent Pioneer. University Press of Kentucky, 2012.

External links

1920 films
1920 drama films
Silent American drama films
Films directed by John Griffith Wray
American silent feature films
1920s English-language films
American black-and-white films
1920s American films